Pinstripes is an American restaurant established in 2007 by founder and CEO Dale Schwartz.  Pinstripes features Italian-American cuisine as well as bowling, bocce court, and event spaces at each location.  The chain has grown to 13 locations across 9 states in the last decade and plans to expand to over 100 locations in the coming years.

References

Restaurant_chains_in_the_United_States